John Fleming, 1st Lord Fleming (c. 1437 – c. 1477).

He was the son of Robert Fleming and Janet Douglas, daughter of James, 7th Earl of Douglas. His son was John Fleming, 2nd Lord Fleming.

References

The Complete Peerage of England, Scotland, Ireland, Great Britain, and the United Kingdom Extant, Extinct, or Dormant; first edition by George Edward Cokayne, Clarenceux King of Arms

1430s births
1477 deaths
16th-century Scottish people
Lord Chamberlains of Scotland
Lords of Parliament (pre-1707)